Ubay Island is an island situated in Cebu Strait, a narrow strait between the islands of Bohol and Cebu, Philippines. Ubay Island is under the jurisdiction of the municipality of Tubigon, Bohol. The total population of Ubay Island is 223.

See also
 List of islands by population density

References

 Islands of Bohol